Padoux is a commune in the Vosges department in Grand Est in northeastern France.

Population
Inhabitants are called Padoselliens.

Geography
Padoux is positioned between Épinal et Rambervillers:  nevertheless, it is administratively within the canton of Bruyères, some across country to the south-east.   Directly the west, and set in the Forest of Padoux, is the little village of Badménil-aux-Bois.

The watershed/drainage divide between the river basins of the Meurthe and of the Moselle runs through the commune.  Two much smaller rivers that cross it are the Mortagne and the Padozel.   The landscape and its customs are at a point of transition between mountain country to the east  and the gently rolling landscape Lorriane Plain to the west.   The soil type reflects a mixture of underlying limestone and clay, with very little Silicon dioxide.   The result is a soil known locally as white earth (terres blanches) and ashen earth (terres rousses):  the latter are particularly suitable for growing cereals in general and especially for wheat.

History
In 1594 and again in 1710 Padoux is recorded as subject to the bailiwick of Épinal: in 1751 it transferred to that of Châtel.   In 1790, as part of the administrative reform that followed the French revolution, Padoux found itself included in the canton of Rambervillers.   The present administrative map of France dates from 1800.

On 21 June 1940 Jean-Paul Sartre was arrested at Padoux by the Germans.   At the time he was serving with the French military as a meteorologist.

Events
Former mayor Alphonse Vauthier relaunched during the second half of the twentieth century an Easter Monday livestock fair which each year continues to attract crowds of traders and of onlookers.

See also
Communes of the Vosges department

References

Communes of Vosges (department)